Tauranga Taupō is a semi-rural area located at the mouth of Tauranga Taupō River, on the southern shores of Lake Taupō in New Zealand's North Island.

Settlements

The area includes three contiguous settlements: Oruatua, near the mouth of the Tauranga Taupō River.  Te Rangiita or Rangiita, and Waitetoko or Waitetoko Beach. These settlements are located southwest to northeast on State Highway 1.

The closest towns are Tūrangi which is 13km south of Te Rangiita and Taupō, which is 37km northwest .

History
The shores of Lake Taupō were first inhabited by Ngāti Hotu during the fourteenth century. Māori legends speak about explorers Tia and Ngātoro-i-rangi, who competed to claim land along the shores of Lake Taupō and passed through Tauranga Taupō. The children of Ngātoro-i-rangi's descendant Tūwharetoa came to the Taupō District and created the iwi Ngāti Tūwharetoa. A descendant of Tūwharetoa named Te Rangi-ita and his son Tama-mutu became important figures in the iwi around the seventeenth century. They were warrior chiefs who established territories in the Taupō District and established the Ngāti Te Rangi-ita hapū in the Tauranga Taupō area.

Colonisation

Europeans began arriving to the Taupō area in the early nineteenth century. The first road along the south eastern side of the lake was built in 1883. 1924 saw the construction of the Tauranga-Taupō bridge completing the road from Taupō to Tokaanu. This would later become State Highway One.

Māori Sites

The local Waitetoko Marae is a marae for the local Ngāti Tūwharetoa hapū of Ngāti Te Rangiita. It includes Te Kapua Whakapipi meeting house.

Demographics
The settlement is part of the larger Lake Taupo Bays statistical area.

Oruatua-Te Rangiita-Waitetoko had a population of 162 at the 2018 New Zealand census, an increase of 15 people (10.2%) since the 2013 census, and an increase of 15 people (10.2%) since the 2006 census. There were 69 households, comprising 81 males and 81 females, giving a sex ratio of 1.0 males per female. The median age was 53.3 years (compared with 37.4 years nationally), with 24 people (14.8%) aged under 15 years, 24 (14.8%) aged 15 to 29, 75 (46.3%) aged 30 to 64, and 39 (24.1%) aged 65 or older.

Ethnicities were 75.9% European/Pākehā, 31.5% Māori, 3.7% Pacific peoples, 1.9% Asian, and 3.7% other ethnicities. People may identify with more than one ethnicity.

Although some people chose not to answer the census's question about religious affiliation, 53.7% had no religion, 35.2% were Christian, 1.9% had Māori religious beliefs and 1.9% had other religions.

Of those at least 15 years old, 15 (10.9%) people had a bachelor's or higher degree, and 24 (17.4%) people had no formal qualifications. The median income was $24,900, compared with $31,800 nationally. 15 people (10.9%) earned over $70,000 compared to 17.2% nationally. The employment status of those at least 15 was that 54 (39.1%) people were employed full-time, 24 (17.4%) were part-time, and 6 (4.3%) were unemployed.

References

Taupō District
Populated places in Waikato
Populated places on Lake Taupō